Daniel Zisette Kushnir better known by his stage name Pause is an American musician and rap artist. The multi-instrumentalist producer  has risen to prominence in 2013 with placements on the Showtime series Ray Donovan (song: "Shouts Out") and Volition's 2013 release, Saints Row IV (soundtrack) (song: "Caroline").

Origin of Name 
The name Pause was originally a nickname given to him by his father—an attempt to teach him to pause before engaging in destructive behaviour.

Discography

External links 
 Pause - Official Website

References

1982 births
Living people